The George Holland House, at 314 N. Exene St. in Gettysburg, South Dakota is a house with elements of Queen Anne style built in 1904.  It was listed on the National Register of Historic Places in 1989.

References

Houses on the National Register of Historic Places in South Dakota
Queen Anne architecture in South Dakota
Houses completed in 1904
National Register of Historic Places in Potter County, South Dakota